This is a list of women photographers who were born in Mexico or whose works are closely associated with that country.

A
 Lola Álvarez Bravo (1907–1993), documentary images of village life, director of photography at the Mexican National Arts Institute
 Colette Álvarez Urbajtel (1934–2020), French-born Mexican photographer, focus on everyday life
 Daisy Ascher (1944–2003), portrait photographer

B
 Ana Casas Broda (born 1965), known for Kinderwunsch photography series

C
 Carmen Castilleja (active since 1980s), fine art photographer
 Blanca Charolet (born 1953), photojournalist and portrait photographer
 Christa Cowrie (born 1949), German-Mexican photographer, photojournalist, focus on dance and theatre

G
 María García (born 1936), photographer, photojournalist
 Maya Goded (born 1967), especially documenting people from hidden or shunned communities
 Lourdes Grobet (born 1940), has made a study of lucha libre

I
 Graciela Iturbide (born 1942), shows everyday life, especially that of indigenous peoples

L
 Paulina Lavista (born 1945), portraits, everyday scenes, nudes

M
 Teresa Margolles (born 1963), portrays death
 Cristina Goettsch Mittermeier (born 1966), marine biologist and conservation photographer, founder of International League of Conservation Photographers
 Virginia Morales (active since 1980s), fine art photographer

P 
 Dulce Pinzon (born 1974), Mexican and Latin immigrants in the United States, figures dressed as superheroes
 Ambra Polidori (born 1954), contemporary artist, photographer

R
 Daniela Rossell (born 1973), painter, photographer

Y
 Mariana Yampolsky (1925–2002), travel photography and documentary work on Mexico's rural areas

See also
List of women photographers

References

-
Mexican women photographers, List of
Photographers
Photographers